Bill Bain or William Bain may refer to:

Bill Bain (consultant) (1937–2018), American management consultant, founder of Bain & Company
Bill Bain (American football) (born 1952), American football player
Bill Bain (director) (1929–1982), Australian-born television director
William Bain (lecturer), academic
William Alexander Bain (1905–1971), Scottish pharmacologist
William J. Bain (1896–1985), Seattle architect, co-founder of NBBJ
Willie Bain (born 1972), Scottish politician

See also
William Bayne (disambiguation)